The 1991 Women's European Volleyball Championship was the 17th edition of the event, organised by Europe's governing volleyball body, the Confédération Européenne de Volleyball. It was hosted in several cities in Italy from 28 September to 6 October 1991, with the final round held in Rome.

Participating teams

*Note: As Italy qualified as hosts and for finishing the 1989 tournament as third, Romania gained a qualification place for finishing fourth in 1989.

Format
The tournament was played in two different stages. In the first stage, the twelve participants were divided in two groups of six teams each. A single round-robin format was played within each group to determine the teams' group position. The second stage of the tournament consisted of two sets of semifinals to determine the tournament final ranking. The group stage firsts and seconds played the semifinals for first to fourth place, group stage thirds and fourths played the fifth to eighth place semifinals and the remaining four teams which finished group stages as fifth and sixth ended all tied in final ranking at ninth place. The pairing of the semifinals was made so teams played against the opposite group teams which finished in a different position (first played against second, third played against fourth).

Pools composition

Venues

Preliminary round

 All times are Central European Summer Time (UTC+02:00).

Pool A
venue location: Ravenna, Italy

|}

|}

Pool B
venue location: Bari, Italy

|}

|}

Final round
venue location: Rome, Italy
 All times are Central European Summer Time (UTC+02:00).

5th–8th place
 Pools A and B third and fourth positions play each other.

5th–8th semifinals

|}

7th place match

|}

5th place match

|}

Final
 Pools A and B first and second positions play each other.

Semifinals

|}

3rd place match

|}

Final

|}

Final ranking

Individual awards
MVP: 
Best Spiker: 
Best Setter:

References
 Confédération Européenne de Volleyball (CEV)

External links
 Results at todor66.com

European Championship
European Championship,1991
European Championship,1991,Women
1991
Volleyball European Championship
European Championship,1991
September 1991 sports events in Europe
October 1991 sports events in Europe
1991 European Volleyball Championship,Women
1991 European Volleyball Championship,Women